AfterLife is the ninth studio album by American heavy metal band Five Finger Death Punch, released on August 19, 2022, via Better Noise. It is the first album since 2007's The Way of the Fist not to feature longtime lead guitarist Jason Hook, who was replaced by Andy James in 2020.

Background
On November 29, 2021, Ivan Moody shared a new snippet of a song off of the upcoming album via Instagram, the video itself shows the frontman banging his head to a brand new song in the studio with producer Kevin Churko right in front of him, a few seconds later the video cuts out, noting that brand new music is in the works for the band. On April 15, 2022, the band officially released a brand new single off the album called "AfterLife", along with a tour announcement with Megadeth and The Hu as supporting acts. To promote the album, the band released a new song entitled "IOU", along with a lyric video and album details as well.

Commercial performance 
Afterlife debuted Number ten on the US Billboard 200 with 30,000 album-equivalent units. The album peaked Top-10 in seven countries worldwide including the United States, and went Number one in Finland, and Switzerland. The album also went Number One on the US Top Hard Rock Albums chart, making it their seventh number one album in that category, and the most number ones in that category in Billboard History. The album received positive reviews, and has sold over 160,000 copies worldwide as of the end of 2022. 

The album consisted of well charting singles. Afterlife the first single off the album peaked number one on the Mainstream Rock chart, along with Times Like These, and Welcome to the Circus. Welcome to the Circus peaked number one on the Czech Republic Rock Songs chart as well.

Track listing

Personnel
 Ivan Moody – lead vocals, production
 Zoltan Bathory – rhythm guitar, production
 Andy James – lead guitar, backing vocals, production
 Chris Kael – bass, backing vocals, production
 Charlie Engen – drums, percussion, production

Technical
 Kevin Churko – production, mixing, engineering
 Kane Churko – engineering
 Tristan Hardin – engineering

Charts

References

2022 albums
Five Finger Death Punch albums
Albums produced by Kevin Churko